The London Diamond League, formerly known as the London Grand Prix and subsequently as the Anniversary Games, is an annual athletics event held in London, England.
Previously one of the five IAAF Super Grand Prix events, it is now part of the Diamond League. As the London Grand Prix, until 2012 all editions were held at the National Sports Centre in Crystal Palace. The 2013 edition was renamed the Anniversary Games as it took place at the Stadium in Queen Elizabeth Olympic Park, exactly one year after the Olympic Games were held in the same venue and have been followed by an IPC London Grand Prix, making it a three-day event. In 2014 the meet was held in Glasgow, Scotland, as preparation for the Commonwealth Games held there later that month.

Event names
The 2018 event will continue to be sponsored by Müller. It was formerly sponsored by Sainsbury's.

Event locations

Emsley Carr Mile
The Emsley Carr Mile remains a fixture at the annual meeting, with a history spanning back to 1953 at the White City Stadium. Emsley Carr, an athletics fan and the editor of The News of the World, created an annual mile race in the hope that the first four-minute mile would be achieved on British soil. Gordon Pirie won the first race, but Roger Bannister had run under 4 minutes in Oxford by time that the second race was competed. However, the tradition continued, with the winner signing his name in a red leather-bound book identical to the Bible used in Queen Elizabeth II's coronation. Derek Ibbotson achieved the first sub-4-minute run at the race in 1956, and many of the best middle-distance runners have won at the Emsley Carr Mile since, including Sebastian Coe, Steve Ovett and Hicham El Guerrouj.

Millicent Fawcett Mile
The Millicent Fawcett Mile, a women's race, was first held in the 2018 Anniversary Games and won by Sifan Hassan in 4:14.71. It commemorates suffragist Millicent Fawcett. There had been a women's mile event at previous games, without this title, the previous record being held by Hellen Obiri who ran in 2017 in 4:16.56.

History
In 2009 pole vault favourite Yelena Isinbayeva lost for the first time in 18 competitions, beaten by Anna Rogowska. Kate Dennison set an eighth British record in the pole vault.

On 24 January 2013 it was announced that London Grand Prix would be moved to the Olympic Stadium for 2013. The London Legacy Development Corporation had expressed interest in holding an athletics event at the stadium to coincide with the first anniversary of the start of the 2012 Summer Olympics. After the 2013 event a return to Crystal Palace was ruled out as according to  Ed Warner it would be a backward step. Hampden Park which was due to host the athletics events at the Commonwealth Games and a temporary venue in Horse Guards Parade and the Mall were mooted for the 2014 edition, before a return to the Olympic Stadium in 2015 due to a gap in the reconstruction schedule. A four-year sponsorship deal with Sainsbury's was announced in January 2014. In February 2014 it was confirmed that the Grand Prix event would move to Hampden Park and be known as the Glasgow Grand Prix. The event returned to London from 2015 and continued to be known as the Anniversary Games .

The 2021 event, due to be held on 13 July was moved away from London Stadium to Gateshead International Stadium due to the difficulty of reconfiguring the stadium for a single athletics event.

World records
Over the course of its history, a number of world records have been set at the London Grand Prix.

Meeting records

Men

Women

References

External links

Diamond League – London Official Web Site

Sports competitions in London
Athletics in London
Athletics competitions in England
Diamond League
IAAF Super Grand Prix
Track and field in the United Kingdom
Annual events in London
Recurring sporting events established in 1953
IAAF Grand Prix
IAAF World Outdoor Meetings